Famelica is a genus of sea snails, marine gastropod mollusks in the family Raphitomidae.

Species
Species within the genus Famelica include:
 Famelica acus Criscione, Hallan, Puillandre & Fedosov, 2021
 Famelica babelica Chino & Stahlschmidt, 2021
 Famelica bitrudis (Barnard, 1963)
 Famelica catharinae (Verrill & Smith, 1884)
 Famelica leucospira Abbate, P. O. V. Lima & Simone, 2022
 Famelica mirmidina (Dautzenberg & Fischer, 1896)
 Famelica monoceros (Watson, 1881)
 Famelica monotropis (Dautzenberg & Fischer, 1896)
 Famelica nitida Sysoev, 1990
 Famelica pacifica Sysoev & Kantor, 1987
 Famelica polyacantha (Stahlschmidt, Chino & Kilburn, 2012)
 Famelica pukua Abbate, P. O. V. Lima & Simone, 2022
 Famelica scipio (Dall, 1889)
 Famelica tajourensis Sysoev & Kantor, 1987
 Famelica tasmanica Sysoev & Kantor, 1987
 Famelica turritelloides Criscione, Hallan, Puillandre & Fedosov, 2021
Species brought into synonymy
 Famelica ischna Dall, 1927: synonym of Famelica monoceros (Watson, 1881)

References

 Bouchet, P. & Warén, A. (1980). Revision of the North-East Atlantic bathyal and abyssal Turridae (Mollusca: Gastropoda). Journal of Molluscan Studies. Suppl. 8: 1-119 
 Gofas, S.; Le Renard, J.; Bouchet, P. (2001). Mollusca. in: Costello, M.J. et al. (eds), European Register of Marine Species: a check-list of the marine species in Europe and a bibliography of guides to their identification. Patrimoines Naturels. 50: 180–213.

External links
 Worldwide Mollusc Species Data Base: Raphitomidae
  Bouchet, P.; Kantor, Y. I.; Sysoev, A.; Puillandre, N. (2011). A new operational classification of the Conoidea (Gastropoda). Journal of Molluscan Studies. 77(3): 273-308
 Criscione, F., Hallan, A., Puillandre, N. & Fedosov, A. (2021). Snails in depth: integrative taxonomy of Famelica, Glaciotomella and Rimosodaphnella (Conoidea: Raphitomidae) from the deep sea of temperate Australia. Invertebrate Systematics. 35: 940-962.

 
Raphitomidae
Gastropod genera